Tingena eumenopa is a species of moth in the family Oecophoridae. It is endemic to New Zealand and found in the North and South Islands. The adults have been found amongst tree ferns and are on the wing in December.

Taxonomy
T. eumenopa was first described by Edward Meyrick in 1926 using specimens collected at Wainuiomata in December and originally named Trachypepla eumenopa. George Hudson discussed this species under the name Trachypepla eumenopa in his 1928 publication The butterflies and moths of New Zealand. In 1939 Hudson synonymised Trachypepla metallifera with this species. In 1988 J. S. Dugdale placed this species within the genus Tingena. The male lectotype, collected at Wainuiomata, is held at the Natural History Museum, London.

Description 

This species was originally described by Meyrick as follows:

Distribution 
This species is endemic to New Zealand. As well as the type locality of Wainuiomata this species has also been observed in Whangārei, Raurimu, Waimarino, Gouland Downs, Nelson, Dunedin, Eglinton Valley and at the Milford Track.

Behaviour 
The adults of this species are on the wing in December.

Habitat 
This species has been collected amongst tree ferns.

References

Oecophoridae
Moths of New Zealand
Moths described in 1926
Endemic fauna of New Zealand
Taxa named by Edward Meyrick
Endemic moths of New Zealand